The Ven.  Frederic William Edmondes, MA  (1840-1918) was Archdeacon of Llandaff from 1897 to 1913.

He was educated at  Cowbridge Grammar School and Jesus College, Oxford;  and ordained in 1865. After a curacy in Newcastle, Bridgend he was Rector of Michaelston-super-Ely from 1867 to   1873; and then of Coity until 1901. He died on 10 November 1918.

References

1840 births
1918 deaths
People from Cowbridge
People educated at Cowbridge Grammar School
Alumni of Jesus College, Oxford
Archdeacons of Llandaff